Barry Thomas is a New Zealand artist and film maker. He is known for creating 1min art films called rADz and for his activism art including in the 1970s planting cabbages in an empty building site in Wellington City.

Biography 
Thomas's first work experience was working on a film set when he was 16. The film was Uenuku, a Māori language drama and also working on it were many artists from Blerta (Geoff Murphy, Bruno Lawrence and Alun Bollinger). After that experience he went to the National Film Unit as a trainee cameraperson. Thomas went on to art school in the late 1970s at the Ilam School of Fine Arts in Christchurch. He was a peer of Vincent Ward and they worked together on the film A State of Siege.

In the 1970s Thomas formed The Artists' Co-op along with Eva Yuen, Ian Hunter, Terry Handscombe and Ross Boyd to "work outside the traditional areas of painting and object sculpture, in the more ephemeral realms of performance and conceptual art." This cooperative received a grant from New Zealand's Arts Council to connect a community within New Zealand and to international artists.

In 1976 Thomas performed an activist intervention in protest of racism and in connection to HART (Halt All Racist Tours). Thomas and friends outlined words "WELCOME TO RACIST GAME" with weed-killer onto the pitch of Lancaster Park rugby field in time for the grass to die before a rugby match where two South African rugby players were due to join the team.

The New Zealand Festival of the Arts in 1977 used a 'happening' by Thomas as the opening event called The Party, where guest were invited but the promised food and drinks were behind a wall of plastic. A group of guests broke down the plastic after 3 minutes.      

Thomas, on 4 January 1978, created a public intervention art,  guerilla art work of art Vacant lot of cabbages illegally on an empty building site in Willis Street in central Wellington. It was created by bringing in soil and planting 180 cabbages that spelled the word 'cabbage' as an urban garden. At the end of June that year the cabbages were harvested. The work deliberately attracted high profile media attention. During that time the location became a central gathering space for artists and community members. At the end of the six months there was a festival called The Last Roxy Show and included a ceremonial burning of the remaining cabbages.

Thomas was one of the cinematographers that captured footage of the 1981 South Africa rugby tour protests that formed part of the film Patu!

Thomas formed a film production company called Yeti Productions and in the 1980s and 1990s they created film and art projects. They also created award winning commercials. A cross-over from this were art-based short clips that screened during commercial breaks but not to sell products but to just be art. These were called rADz, 'radical art ads' or 'haiku films' and aired between 1997 and 2001. In New Zealand 100 rADz were made with many artists and filmmakers involved including Lala Rolls, Greg Page and Nova Paul. More were made in the UK and were presented at film festivals.

In 2012 Te Papa purchased documentation of Thomas's 1978 Vacant lot of cabbages art project.

Art exhibitions 

 Work (1978) – New Zealand Academy of Fine Art - group exhibition with The Artists' Co-op (Barry Thomas, Eva Yuen, Ian Hunter, Terry Handscombe and Ross Boyd)
 When art hits the headlines: a survey of controversial art in New Zealand (1987) – Shed 11, National Art Gallery, New Zealand – group exhibition curated by Jim and Mary Barr
 Artists as Activists: Environment (2010) – New Zealand Academy of Fine Arts – group exhibition (Don Binney, Dean Buchanan, Nick Dryden, Ian Hamlin, Sam Mahon, Euan McDougall, Rosemary Mortimer, Michael O'Donnell, Michael Smither, Grahame Sydney, Barry Thomas, Brian Turner and Jane Zusters)

Film 

 HeartlanNZ – documentary sponsored by the Department of Conservation

References

External links 
 HeartlanNZ, a 50-minute documentary by Barry Thomas

Living people
New Zealand artists
New Zealand cinematographers
Year of birth missing (living people)